In geometry, the elongated triangular cupola is one of the Johnson solids . As the name suggests, it can be constructed by elongating a triangular cupola by attaching a hexagonal prism to its base.

Formulae
The following formulae for volume and surface area can be used if all faces are regular, with edge length a:

Dual polyhedron 

The dual of the elongated triangular cupola has 15 faces: 6 isosceles triangles, 3 rhombi, and 6 quadrilaterals.

Related polyhedra and honeycombs

The elongated triangular cupola can form a tessellation of space with tetrahedra and square pyramids.

References

External links
 

Johnson solids